Máel Petair of Mearns is the only known Mormaer of the Mearns. His name means "tonsured one of (Saint) Peter".

Professor Dauvit Broun of the University of Glasgow identifies his father as a man called Loren. Little is known of him except that, in 1094, he is said to have killed King Duncan II of Scotland, suggesting he was an associate of Donald III of Scotland.

Bibliography
 Anderson, Alan Orr, Early Sources of Scottish History: AD 500-1286, 2 Vols, (Edinburgh, 1922), Vol. II, pp. 89–91

References

11th-century Scottish people
11th-century murderers
People from Kincardine and Mearns
Mormaers
Scottish regicides
11th-century mormaers